Kayhan Maleki (born ) is an Iranian actor.

Career 

Keyhan Maleki began his career in 1978 by performing in school theaters until 1983. He commenced his career in cinema in 1993 by acting in the movie Great Hopes.

Keyhan Maleki introduce to TV by Analect of 39 (1994) and became popular by Youthful Days TV series (1999–2000). His best performance was in Neibours TV series.

Keyhan Maleki illustrated his successful career in cinema. His performance in Miracle of Smile (1997) and Rainman (1999) are examples of his capabilities.

Notes

External links 

 

Living people
1968 births
People from Tehran
Iranian male film actors
Iranian male television actors
Iranian male stage actors
Islamic Azad University alumni